HMS Galatea was one of eight  light cruisers built for the Royal Navy in the 1910s. She fought in the First World War, participating in the Battle of Jutland. Following the war, she was scrapped.

Design and description
The Arethusa-class cruisers were intended to lead destroyer flotillas and defend the fleet against attacks by enemy destroyers.

The main armament of the Arethusa-class ships was two BL 6-inch (152 mm) Mk XII guns that were mounted on the centreline fore and aft of the superstructure and six QF 4-inch Mk V guns in waist mountings. They were also fitted with a single QF 3-pounder  anti-aircraft gun and four  torpedo tubes in two twin mounts.

Service history
She was launched on 14 May 1914 at William Beardmore and Company shipyard. On her commissioning she was assigned as the leader to the 2nd Destroyer Flotilla of the Harwich Force, guarding the eastern approaches to the English Channel. On 4 May 1916, she took part in the shooting down of Zeppelin L 7. At the Battle of Jutland, she was the flagship of the 1st Light Cruiser Squadron under Commodore E.S. Alexander-Sinclair. She was the first ship to report the presence of German ships, triggering the battle. Galatea was also the first to receive a hit by the German light cruiser , but no explosion occurred. She was sold for scrapping on 25 October 1921. Mount Galatea in Alberta, Canada is named after this ship.

Notes

Bibliography

External links

Ships of the Arethusa class
Battle of Jutland Crew Lists Project - HMS Galatea Crew List

 

Arethusa-class cruisers (1913)
1914 ships
World War I cruisers of the United Kingdom
Ships built on the River Clyde